The Berrys River is a  river located in southeastern New Hampshire in the United States. It is a tributary of the Isinglass River, part of the Cocheco River/Piscataqua River watershed leading to the Atlantic Ocean.

The river rises in Farmington, New Hampshire, and flows southeast past Blue Job Mountain. Turning south, the river passes through the eastern corner of Strafford and enters Barrington, where it is interrupted by Long Pond. One mile below the pond, the Berrys River reaches the Isinglass.

See also

List of rivers of New Hampshire

References

Rivers of New Hampshire
Rivers of Strafford County, New Hampshire